Kalpataru Day also called Kalpataru Diwas or Kalpataru Utsav is an annual religious festival observed by monks of the Ramakrishna Math monastic order of Hinduism and lay followers of the associated Ramakrishna Mission, as well as the worldwide  Vedanta Societies.  These organizations follow the teachings of Ramakrishna, the 19th century Indian mystic and figure in the Bengali Renaissance.

The event commemorates the day on 1 January 1886, when his followers believe that Ramakrishna revealed himself to be an Avatar, or God incarnate on earth.  It is held each 1 January. Although the observances are held in many locations, the most significant celebration takes place at Kashipur Garden House or  Udyanbati near Kolkata (then called Calcutta), present Ramakrishna Math, a branch of Ramakrishna Order, the place where Ramakrishna spent the last days of his life.

The day was named as Kalpataru Day by Ramakrishna's disciple Ramachandra Dutta. This event carried meanings and memories of cosmic import for the disciples and also prepared them for Ramakrishna's death, which occurred only a few months later, on 16 August 1886.

References

External links
Kalpataru Day (1 Jan) Celebrations

Ramakrishna Mission
New Year celebrations
Vedanta
January observances